Wuxiang County is a county in the southeast of Shanxi province, China. It is the northernmost county-level division of the prefecture-level city of Changzhi.

Climate

References

Weblinks
www.xzqh.org 

 
County-level divisions of Shanxi
Changzhi